Ra'ash is a sub-district located in Dhi al-Sufal District, Ibb Governorate, Yemen. Ra'ash had a population of 2138 as of 2004.

References 

Sub-districts in Dhi As Sufal District